Briggs Reservoir is a  reservoir in Plymouth, Massachusetts located in the Manomet section of town south of Shallow Pond, southwest of Manomet Beach, northwest of Vallerville and northeast of Morey Hole. Indian Brook flows through the reservoir. There are two unnamed islands in the reservoir. The water quality is impaired due to non-native aquatic plants and non-native fish in the reservoir.

There is another Briggs Reservoir located within Plymouth's boundaries in Billington Sea village.

External links
Environmental Protection Agency
South Shore Coastal Watersheds - Lake Assessments

Lakes of Plymouth, Massachusetts
Reservoirs in Massachusetts